The Family Law is an Australian comedy television program created by Benjamin Law. The six-part series, loosely adapted from Law's 2010 book of the same name, was written by Law and Marieke Hardy. The series was produced by Matchbox Pictures and screened on SBS from 14 January 2016. A second season of the show premiered on 15 June 2017. The third and final season of the show aired on 12 January 2019. The show streams on Hulu in the US.

Plot
The series follows the dysfunctional world of a Chinese-Australian family through the eyes of 14-year-old Benjamin Law. It is set on the Sunshine Coast, Queensland, but filmed in Sunnybank Brisbane, over a long, hot summer the family will never forget. The family consists of Benjamin Law, eldest sister Candy, older brother Andrew, younger sisters Tammy and Michelle and parents Jenny and Danny.

Cast

Main cast
 Trystan Go as Benjamin Law
 Fiona Choi as Jenny Law
 Anthony Brandon Wong as Danny Law
 Shuang Hu as Candy Law 
 George Zhao as Andrew Law
 Karina Lee as Tammy Law
 Vivian Wei as Michelle Law
 Bethany Whitmore as Melissa Hills, Benjamin's friend

Recurring cast
 Kimie Tsukakoshi as Heidi Thomson
 Takaya Honda as Klaus Thomson
 Sam Cotton as Wayne, Candy's boyfriend
 Diana Lin as Maisy, Jenny's acquaintance
 Loretta Kung as Daisy, Jenny's acquaintance

Episodes

Series 1 (2016)

Series 2 (2017)

Series 3 (2019)

Reception and ratings
During the run of its first series The Family Law averaged a national audience of 417,000. It was also the highest viewed program on SBS On Demand throughout the series.

The program attracted an audience of 1.1 million views for its exclusive Facebook premiere of its first episode days before it aired on television.

Critical reception
The program has received critical acclaim from critics.

One critic from Daily Review Australia said "the core challenge is making a captivating comedy series about normal people living normal lives. The Family Law gives it a good crack, and has an amiable quality that many viewers will find endearing."

Another critic from The Guardian said "there’s so much detail, warmth and gentle humour to the script, direction and production design that the characters and settings are relatable for anyone who grew up – or is growing up – in Australia." She gave the program 4 out of 5 stars.

Awards and accolades

References

External links 
 
 

Special Broadcasting Service original programming
2010s Australian comedy television series
2016 Australian television series debuts
2019 Australian television series endings
Television series by Matchbox Pictures